Winnifred Eaton (August 21, 1875 – April 8, 1954) was a Canadian author and screenwriter of Chinese-British ancestry. Publishing prolifically under a number of names, most predominantly, the pseudonym Onoto Watanna, she was one of the first North American writers of Asian descent to publish fiction in English.

Biography 
Eaton was the daughter of an English merchant, Edward C. Eaton (1839 – 1915), and a Chinese performer, Achuen "Grace" Amoy (1846 – 1922). The two married in Shanghai in 1863 but relocated to England a year later. Over the next few years, the Eaton family moved back and forth from England to New York several times before finally relocating permanently to Montreal in 1872, where Winnifred was born.

The Eaton family was large; Winnifred was the eighth of 12 children who survived infancy. Edward Eaton struggled to support the family, who moved frequently from one lodging to the next. Nonetheless, the children were raised in an intellectually stimulating environment. Winnifred's eldest sister, Edith Maude Eaton, would become a journalist and, under the pen name Sui Sin Far, an author of stories about Chinese immigrants to the United States, and her older sister Grace Helen Eaton would marry fin-de-siècle editor Walter Blackburn Harte.

Winnifred achieved early success, publishing her first stories in Canadian and U.S. newspapers and magazines as a teenager and publishing her first novel, Miss Nume of Japan, in 1898. She would eventually publish over a dozen novels and dozens of short stories and articles. 

While living in New York City, Eaton met journalist Bertrand Babcock, the son of Emma Whitcomb Babcock and Charles Almanzo Babcock. The two married in 1901 and had four children, three sons and a daughter; Perry, the oldest, died as a child. Their marriage ended in divorce in 1917, and in the same year, Eaton married Francis Fournier Reeve. Moving to Alberta in her native Canada, Eaton ranched with her husband while continuing to write. For a time in the mid-1920s, she moved to work in the film industry, first to New York in 1924 and then, in 1925, to Hollywood. 

She returned to Calgary in 1932 and became an active member of the artistic community, founding Alberta's Little Theatre Movement and serving as the president of the Calgary branch of the Canadian Authors' Association.

In 1954, while returning home from a vacation in California, Eaton fell ill and died of heart failure in Butte, Montana. Following her death, her husband donated funds to build the Reeve Theatre at the University of Calgary.

Literary career 

Eaton claimed to be only 14 when one of her stories was accepted for publication by a Montreal newspaper that had already published pieces by her sister. In fact, she was almost 20 when her story "A Poor Devil" was published in Metropolitan Magazine. Eaton left home at age 20 to take a job as a stenographer for a newspaper in Kingston, Jamaica. She remained there for less than a year, then moved to Cincinnati, Ohio, and then Chicago, Illinois, where for a time she worked as a typist while continuing to write short stories. Eventually, her compositions were accepted by the prestigious Saturday Evening Post as well as by other popular periodicals. She published her first novel, Miss Nume of Japan capitalizing on her mixed ancestry to pass herself off as a Japanese American by the name of Onoto Watanna (which sounds Japanese but is not Japanese at all). 

In 1900, Eaton moved to New York City, where her second major novel, A Japanese Nightingale, was published. It proved extremely successful, being translated into several languages and eventually adapted both as a Broadway play and then, in 1918, as a motion picture. Her novel Tama (1910) was a runaway bestseller and her novel Me, A Book of Remembrance, a thinly disguised memoir, told a titillating tale of a woman's infidelities. Under her Japanese pseudonym, Eaton published many romance novels and short stories and journalistic works that were widely read throughout the United States. Over the course of her 40-year career, Eaton also had articles published in many popular magazines in the United States, including the Ladies' Home Journal and Harper's Monthly.

In collaboration with her sister Sara Eaton Bosse, Eaton published the Chinese-Japanese Cook Book in 1914. The authors preface their history of Asian food and a representative selection of recipes with the reassurance that "When it is known how simple and clean are the ingredients used to make up these oriental dishes, the Westerner will cease to feel that natural repugnance which assails one when about to taste a strange dish of a new and strange land."

After marrying Frank Reeve and moving to Alberta, Eaton continued to write fiction and journalism, mostly with an Albertan focus. She became intrigued by the financial opportunities offered in the burgeoning film industry and began to write scenarios, or early screenplays, for silent films. After receiving her first credit from Universal Studios in 1921 for the scenario for the silent film False Kisses, she left Calgary in 1924 to work at Universal's New York City offices. The following year, Universal tapped her to lead their scenario department in Hollywood, California. She also ghost-wrote scripts for Metro-Goldwyn-Mayer. She is credited on six films, all produced by Universal; her work on many others remains uncredited.

Eaton's publications, including all her novels, have been collected in the Winnifred Eaton Archive.

Partial bibliography
His Royal Nibs (1925)
Cattle (1923)
Sunny-San (1922) 
Marion: The Story of an Artist's Model (1916); reprint edition edited by Karen E. H. Skinazi (2012)
Me: A Book of Remembrance (1915); reprint edition edited by Linda Trinh Moser (1997)
Chinese-Japanese Cook Book (with Sara Eaton Bosse, 1914)
The Honorable Miss Moonlight (1912)
Tama (1910)
The Diary of Delia (1907)
A Japanese Blossom (1906)
The Love of Azalea (1904) 
Daughters of Nijo (1904) 
The Heart of Hyacinth (1903); reprint edition edited by Samina Najmi (2000)
The Wooing of Wistaria (1902) 
A Japanese Nightingale (1901); reprint edition (published with Madame Butterfly, by John Luther Long) edited by Jean Lee Cole and Maureen Honey (2002)
Miss Numè of Japan (1899); reprint edition edited by Eve Oishi (1999)

Selected filmography 

 East Is West (1930)
 Young Desire (1930) 
 Undertow (1930) 
 Shanghai Lady (1929) 
 The Mississippi Gambler (1929) 
 False Kisses (1921)

Further reading 
Birchall, Diana. Onoto Watanna: The Story of Winnifred Eaton (2001)

Cole, Jean Lee. The Literary Voices of Winnifred Eaton: Redefining Ethnicity and Authenticity (2002)

Ferens, Dominika. "Affect and Form in the Writings of the Eaton Sisters." In Asian American Literature in Transition, 1850-1930, ed. Josephine Lee and Julia H. Lee (2021)

Ferens, Dominika. Edith and Winnifred Eaton: Chinatown Missions and Japanese Romances (2002)

Lavery, Grace E. Quaint, Exquisite: Victorian Aesthetics and the Idea of Japan (2019)

Sheffer, Jolie A. The Romance of Race: Incest, Miscegenation, and Multiculturalism in the United States, 1880-1930 (2012)

Skinazi, Karen E. H. "'As to Her Race, Its Secret Is Loudly Revealed': Winnifred Eaton's Revision of North American Identity." MELUS: The Journal of the Society for the Study of the Multi-Ethnic LIterature of the United States 32(2): 31-53 (2007)

Teng, Emma Jinhua. "The Eaton Sisters and the Figure of the Eurasian." The Cambridge History of Asian American Literature, ed. Min Hyoung Song, pp 661-672 (2015)

Watanna, Onoto. "A Half Caste" and Other Writings, edited by Linda Trinh Moser and Elizabeth Rooney, eds. (2003)

See also 

List of Asian American writers
List of women writers

References

External links 

 
 
 The Winnifred Eaton Archive Peer-edited scholarly archive of the collected works of Winnifred Eaton, University of British Columbia
 Winnifred Eaton Project: Essays from a conference and exhibit on Winnifred Eaton, Mount Allison University
 Winnifred Eaton Reeve Fonds Guide to the collection of her papers at University of Calgary Archives and Special Collections
 Onoto Watanna (Winnifred Eaton) entry in Donna M. Campbell's "American Authors" site
 Winnifred Eaten (Onoto Watanna) entry in the Canadian Encyclopedia
 
 Winnifred Eaton, from Wikinfo, licensed under the GNU Free Documentation License.

1875 births
1954 deaths
American writers of Chinese descent
Canadian women screenwriters
Canadian women novelists
Canadian people of Chinese descent
Canadian people of English descent
Canadian writers of Asian descent
Pseudonymous women writers
20th-century Canadian novelists
20th-century Canadian screenwriters
20th-century Canadian women writers
20th-century pseudonymous writers
Women film pioneers